The 1948 Kilkenny Senior Hurling Championship was the 54th staging of the Kilkenny Senior Hurling Championship since its establishment by the Kilkenny County Board.

On 22 August 1948, Tullaroan won the championship after a 1-12 to 2-03 defeat of Carrickshock in the final. It was their 18th championship title overall and their first title in 14 championship seasons.

Results

Final

References

Kilkenny Senior Hurling Championship
Kilkenny Senior Hurling Championship